This is a list of megathrust earthquakes that have occurred. Megathrust earthquakes are large seismic events that take place along convergent plate boundaries, particularly at subduction zones. Examples of subduction zones include the Sumatra and Java trenches, Nankai Trough and Peru–Chile Trench which are frequent sources of these earthquakes.

List
The inclusion criteria in this list is any notable subduction earthquake of at least magnitude 8.0.

Pre-11th century

11th–18th century

19th century

20th century

21st century

See also
Lists of earthquakes
Megathrust earthquake

References

Sources

 

Lists of earthquakes
Megathrust earthquakes
Lists of events lists
Lists of natural disasters